Primer Encuentro de Mujeres Negras de América Latina y El Caribe (First Meeting of Latin American and Caribbean Women Negras) was an international conference of 300 representatives from 32 (70 is also mentioned) countries, which occurred 19–25 July 1992 in Santo Domingo, Dominican Republic. One of its organizers was Ochy Curiel, an Afro-Dominican feminist academic. One of the outcomes of the meeting was an announcement to commemorate July 25th annually as "Día Internacional de las Mujeres negras Afrolatinoamericanas, caribeñas y de la diáspora" (International Day of Black Women of Afro-Latin America, the Caribbean, and the Diaspora).

Notes

References

Women's conferences
1992 conferences
20th century in Santo Domingo